Demetrius Harris (born July 29, 1991) is an American football tight end who is a free agent. He played college basketball at University of Wisconsin–Milwaukee, which has no college football program. He was signed by the Kansas City Chiefs as an undrafted free agent in 2013.

College career
After a standout high school career at Jacksonville High School in Jacksonville, Arkansas, where he made All-State in both football and basketball, Harris originally signed with Arkansas State to play football, but, after failing to qualify academically, he decided to switch to basketball instead. Attending Mineral Area College, Harris played basketball for two seasons, before transferring to Milwaukee for his final two eligible seasons.

After playing off the bench his junior year, Harris was a starter his senior year, starting in 28 of 32 games. Despite the Panthers having a lowly 8–24 record, Harris finished 9th in the Horizon League in field goal shooting (46.9%) and led the Panthers in rebounds. After the conclusion of the basketball season, even though he had not played organized football since high school, NFL scouts showed interest in Harris playing football again, citing his size (6'7", 230 lb.) as ideal for the tight end position. Among the teams that showed interest in Harris included the Kansas City Chiefs, Baltimore Ravens, and Dallas Cowboys. To show off his skills for scouts, he held a workout with the Milwaukee Panthers football club team, otherwise known as MPFC.

Professional career

Kansas City Chiefs

2013–2015 seasons
Harris was signed by the Kansas City Chiefs after going undrafted in the 2013 NFL Draft.

After spending his 2013 season on the Chiefs' practice squad, Harris made the official roster in 2014, though his rookie season was cut short by a broken foot, ending his season after eight games.

In the 2015 season, Harris caught seven passes for 74 yards as a backup tight end, mainly used for blocking. Harris caught his first NFL touchdown pass, a 15-yard reception from quarterback Alex Smith, on the final game of the regular season, against the Oakland Raiders. On January 8, 2016, Harris signed a three-year, $6.3 million contract extension.

2016 season
In the 2016 season, on Christmas Day, against the Denver Broncos, Harris caught a one-yard touchdown pass from Dontari Poe, who became the largest player in NFL history to throw a touchdown, in the fourth quarter. He appeared in all 16 games, of which started 11, in the 2017 season. He totaled 17 receptions for 123 receiving yards and one receiving touchdown.

2017 season
In the 2017 season opening 42–27 victory against the New England Patriots, Harris caught the first receiving touchdown of the NFL season with a seven-yard reception from quarterback Alex Smith in the first quarter. He appeared in all 16 games, of which he started seven, in the 2017 season. He totaled 18 receptions for 224 receiving yards and one receiving touchdown.

2018 season
On May 22, 2018, Harris was suspended the first game of the 2018 season after pleading guilty to a marijuana possession misdemeanor in March 2017. He appeared in 15 games, of which he started three, in the 2018 season. He finished with 12 receptions for 164 receiving yards and three receiving touchdowns.

Cleveland Browns
On March 14, 2019, Harris signed a two-year, $6 million contract with the Cleveland Browns. He appeared in 15 games, of which he started six. He finished with 15 receptions for 149 receiving yards and three receiving touchdowns.

Harris was released by the Browns on February 17, 2020.

Chicago Bears
On February 19, 2020, Harris was signed by the Chicago Bears.

Arizona Cardinals
On August 11, 2021, Harris signed with the Arizona Cardinals.

NFL career statistics

References

External links
 Chicago Bears bio
 Milwaukee Panthers basketball bio

1991 births
Living people
American football tight ends
American men's basketball players
Arizona Cardinals players
Basketball players from Arkansas
Chicago Bears players
Cleveland Browns players
Forwards (basketball)
Junior college men's basketball players in the United States
Kansas City Chiefs players
Milwaukee Panthers men's basketball players
Mineral Area College alumni
People from Jacksonville, Arkansas
Players of American football from Arkansas
Sportspeople from Pulaski County, Arkansas